This is a list of the tallest minarets in the world. It ranks minarets by their height.

The tallest minaret in the world is the minaret of the Djamaa el Djazaïr in Algiers, Algeria which stands at 265 metres (870 ft).

List of tallest minarets
This list ranks the tallest minarets in the world. Only minarets taller than 25 metres (82 feet) or remarkable for some distinctive feature are included.

See also 

 List of tallest mosques
 Minaret
 Mosque
 List of oldest minarets

References 

 

Minarets